Sparta is an unincorporated community in Bienville Parish, Louisiana, United States.

Joseph Samuel Clark (1871-1944), educator, was born in Sparta.

Notes

Unincorporated communities in Bienville Parish, Louisiana
Unincorporated communities in Louisiana